George Ferdinand Strohmeyer, Jr. (January 27, 1924 – January 12, 1992) was an American football player who played two seasons in the All-America Football Conference (AAFC) with the Brooklyn Dodgers and Chicago Hornets.
He enrolled at Texas A&M University before transferring to the University of Notre Dame. Strohmeyer attended McAllen High School in McAllen, Texas. He was drafted by the Los Angeles Rams of the National Football League (NFL) in the thirteenth round of the 1946 NFL Draft.

Early years
Strohmeyer played high school football as a center for the McAllen High School Bulldogs. He was named Best Blocker on the All-Valley squad in 1941 and was also one of the area's best placekickers. He graduated in 1941. Strohmeyer was also a Golden Gloves champion.

College career
Strohmeyer first played college football as a freshman for the Texas A&M Aggies. He then joined the United States Navy in 1943. He played football on several military bases, earning Service Football All-America honors in 1944 and 1945. Strohmeyer lettered for the Notre Dame Fighting Irish from 1946 to 1947. He also earned All-American honors in 1946 and 1947.

Professional career
Strohmeyer was selected by the Los Angeles Rams of the NFL with the 120th pick in the 1946 NFL Draft. He played in fourteen games, starting seven, for the AAFC's Brooklyn Dodgers in 1948 and earned Associated Press Second Team All-AAFC honors. He played in twelve games, starting one, for the Chicago Hornets of the AAFC during the 1949 season.

Personal life
Strohmeyer  was inducted into the Rio Grande Valley Sports Hall of Fame in 1990. He became a football coach after his playing career. He had stints at St. Ambrose University, Saint Joseph Academy and other schools.

References

External links
Just Sports Stats

1924 births
1992 deaths
American football centers
American football linebackers
Brooklyn Dodgers (AAFC) players
Chicago Hornets players
Iowa Pre-Flight Seahawks football players
Notre Dame Fighting Irish football players
St. Ambrose Fighting Bees football coaches
Texas A&M Aggies football players
United States Navy personnel of World War II
Sportspeople from Kansas City, Missouri
Players of American football from Kansas City, Missouri